The Root of Evil is a 1911 novel by Thomas Dixon, Jr.

Plot summary
James Stuart, a Southerner, becomes a successful attorney in New York City. Meanwhile, Nan Primrose, his childhood lover marries his college friend, John C. Calhoun Bivens, now a millionnaire lawyer. At the same time, Dr Henry Woodman takes care of the poor in New York, and opposes the takeover of a drug company by Bivens. Stuart eventually marries his daughter. When Woodman steals some jewelry from Bivens, he goes through a trial but is acquitted by the judges thanks to his good deeds.

Main theme
Biographer Anthony Slide viewed the book as an 'attack on capitalism.'

Critical reception
Slide called it 'a novel for today and for all ages.' It has also been called 'a novel with a purpose'

References

External links
The Novel at Project Gutenberg

1911 American novels
Novels set in New York City
Novels by Thomas Dixon Jr.